Irvin Williams (August 17, 1919 – December 14, 2019) was an American jazz saxophonist and composer. Throughout his nine-decade career, Williams focused on the Great American Songbook and the tenor sax as a solo vehicle.

Musical history
His first instrument was the violin before switching to the clarinet and then to the tenor saxophone.

In 1942 Williams moved to Saint Paul, (Minnesota). In his early career, he played in bands behind Ella Fitzgerald, Fletcher Henderson, Mary Lou Williams, and Billy Eckstine at venues such as the Apollo Theater or the Howard Theater. Turning down invitations to go on tour with Duke Ellington, Count Basie, or Louis Armstrong, he chose to stay and become part of the Minneapolis–Saint Paul (Twin Cities), history.
While teaching in various public schools in St. Paul, he played with the late Reginald Buckner. In the Twin Cities, Williams has played at every jazz venue, past and present, including the old Flame Bar where he was often back to back with such stars as Sarah Vaughan, Dizzy Gillespie, and Johnny Hodges.

Since his 84th birthday, Williams came up with a stream of releases: That’s All (2004), Dedicated to You (2005), followed by one of his most acclaimed, Duo (2006) with piano partner Peter Schimke, and Finality (2008). In 2011, Williams recorded Duke's Mixture, a quintet with Peter Schimke, Steve Blons, Billy Peterson and Jay Epstein; the set list includes five original compositions from Williams and his vocal debut on "Until the Real Thing Comes Along", together with two Irving Berlin standards and a pair of blues tunes.

Irv Williams had a regular weekly gig at the Dakota Jazz Club in downtown Minneapolis.

Personal life
Williams had nine children from two marriages.

Honors and awards
 1984 – First jazz musician to be honored by the State of Minnesota with his own "Irv Williams Day".
 1990 – Picture appeared on the "Celebrate Minnesota" official state map 
 1995 – Named an Arts Midwest Jazz Master
 2005 – At the KBEM Winter Jazz Festival, Irv was one of three recipients of Lifetime Achievement Awards.
 2010 – Appeared on the cover of Saint Paul Almanac
 Inducted into the Minnesota Jazz Hall of Fame
 His former saxophone has been integrated into the "Minnesota’s Greatest Generation" exhibit at the Minnesota History Center

Discography
 Keep the Music Playing (1994)
 Peace, with Strings (1996)
 STOP Look and Listen (2000)
 Encore (2001)
 That’s All (2004)
 Dedicated To You CD (2005) 
 Duo - Irv Williams and Peter Schimke (2006)
 Finality (2008)
 Duke’s Mixture (2011)
 Then Was Then, Now Is Now (2014)
 Pinnacle - Irv Williams Trio (2015)

Filmography
 2012 – featured in Arts and the Mind, a documentary on PBS
 2012 – The Funkytown Movie, music documentary by Megabien Entertainment

References

External links
Jazz legend Irv Williams at MPRnews
Irv Williams on SPNN's Doc U program
Irv Williams: A Life in Music
Irv Williams Discography at artists.MTV
 

1919 births
2019 deaths
African-American jazz musicians
American jazz saxophonists
American male saxophonists
21st-century American saxophonists
21st-century American male musicians
American male jazz musicians
African-American centenarians
American centenarians
Men centenarians
21st-century African-American musicians
20th-century African-American people
20th-century American saxophonists